Rudolf Pillwein is an Austrian retired slalom canoeist who competed in the 1940s and the 1950s. He won three medals at the ICF Canoe Slalom World Championships with a gold (Folding K-1 team: 1951) and two silvers (Folding K-1: 1951, Folding K-1 team: 1949).

References

Austrian male canoeists
Possibly living people
Year of birth missing (living people)
Medalists at the ICF Canoe Slalom World Championships